Advance Wars 1+2: Re-Boot Camp is an upcoming 2023 turn-based strategy video game developed by WayForward and published by Nintendo for the Nintendo Switch. It is a remake of the first two titles in the Advance Wars series, Advance Wars (2001), and Advance Wars 2: Black Hole Rising (2003). It is set to release on April 21, 2023.

Gameplay 
Advance Wars 1+2: Re-Boot Camp is a remake of Advance Wars (2001), and Advance Wars 2: Black Hole Rising (2003), which were originally developed by Intelligent Systems. It is a turn-based strategy game where the player controls the tactical advisor of the Orange Star Army, and is needed to defend their homeland. In addition to the story campaigns of both games, Advance Wars 1+2 also includes a "Versus" mode that supports both local and online multiplayer, and a map maker.

Marketing and release 
The game was first announced during Nintendo's E3 2021 Nintendo Direct on June 15, with a release date of December 3 the same year. The game was delayed to April 8, 2022, prior to the December 2021 release and then delayed indefinitely on March 9, 2022, due to the 2022 Russian invasion of Ukraine. Another release date of April 21, 2023, was announced in February 2023.

References 

WayForward games
Upcoming video games scheduled for 2023
Wars (series)
Nintendo Switch games
Nintendo Switch-only games
Video game remakes
Video games developed in the United States